The canton of Périgord Central is an administrative division of the Dordogne department, southwestern France. It was created at the French canton reorganisation which came into effect in March 2015. Its seat is in Vergt.

It consists of the following communes:

Beauregard-et-Bassac
Beleymas
Bourrou
Campsegret
Chalagnac
Clermont-de-Beauregard
Creyssensac-et-Pissot
Douville
Église-Neuve-de-Vergt
Église-Neuve-d'Issac
Eyraud-Crempse-Maurens
Fouleix
Grun-Bordas
Issac
Lacropte
Limeuil
Montagnac-la-Crempse
Paunat
Saint-Amand-de-Vergt
Saint-Georges-de-Montclard
Saint-Hilaire-d'Estissac
Saint-Jean-d'Estissac
Saint-Martin-des-Combes
Saint-Mayme-de-Péreyrol
Saint-Michel-de-Villadeix
Saint-Paul-de-Serre
Salon
Sanilhac (partly)
Trémolat
Val de Louyre et Caudeau
Vergt
Veyrines-de-Vergt
Villamblard

References

Cantons of Dordogne